Jean de La Varende (24 May 1887 at the Château de Bonneville in Chamblac, Eure – 8 June 1959) was a French writer. He wrote novels, short stories, biographies and monographs, in particular on the subject of Normandy. He initially tried to become a naval officer like his father, but gave up because of his weak heart. He was elected into the Académie Goncourt in 1942.

He received the 1938 Grand Prix du roman de l'Académie française for Centaur of God. His 1936 novel Leather-Nose was the basis for the 1952 film Leathernose, directed by Yves Allégret.

References 

People from Eure
1887 births
1959 deaths
French biographers
20th-century French novelists
French male short story writers
French short story writers
Writers from Normandy
French male novelists
20th-century biographers
20th-century short story writers
Grand Prix du roman de l'Académie française winners
French military personnel of World War I
Knights of the Ordre du Mérite Maritime
20th-century French male writers
French male non-fiction writers
Male biographers